"Question" is a 1970 single by the English progressive rock band the Moody Blues. It was written by guitarist Justin Hayward, who provides lead vocals. "Question" was first released as a single in April 1970 and remains their second highest-charting song in the UK, reaching number two and staying on the chart for 12 weeks. The song reached number 21 on the Billboard Top 40 in the USA. It was later featured as the lead track on the 1970 album A Question of Balance. The single also features the song "Candle of Life" on its B-side, which was from the Moody Blues' previous album To Our Children's Children's Children.

Hayward pieced the song together from two unfinished songs, which accounts for the change of pace in the middle of the song.  Hayward said that:

"Question" is one of the Moody Blues' most popular songs, and has been included in virtually all of their compilations and live albums. In addition, the song was re-recorded (along with "Isn't Life Strange") in the studio with the London Symphony Orchestra (who in 1978 had released an orchestral cover of the song) in 1988, for the Greatest Hits album.

Cash Box described the song as starting "with a guitar intro in the Who manner" that "[churns] up instant listener interest from the start" and then "alters midway to become a brilliantly presented ballad in the [Moody Blues'] own tradition."

Ultimate Classic Rock critic Nick DeRiso rated it as the Moody Blues' greatest song, saying that the merging of two unfinished songs "achieve[d] this perfectly calibrated sense of emotional turbulence." Classic Rock critic Malcolm Dome rated it as the Moody Blues' 3rd greatest song, saying that it "offers a powerful message that still retains an ability to emotionally move you."

Classic Rock History critic Brian Kachejian rated it as the Moody Blues' 5th greatest song, saying that it "featured one of the greatest acoustic guitar openings of any classic rock track in history" and that the "killer vocal" and "the dynamic time change in the middle of the track" add to its status. Kachejian also noted that Graeme Edge's drum fill after the line "Why do we never get an answer when there’s knocking at the door" "catapulted the song into classic rock history."

Former Marillion singer Fish covered the song as one of his personal favourites for his album Songs from the Mirror, released in 1993. In 2010, Nada Surf covered the song on their album "If I Had a Hi-Fi."

Personnel
 Justin Hayward – 12-string acoustic guitar, lead vocals
 John Lodge – bass guitar, backing vocals
 Mike Pinder – Mellotron, backing vocals (1970 recording)
 Ray Thomas – tambourine, backing vocals
 Graeme Edge – drums, percussion
 Patrick Moraz – keyboards (1988 recording)
 Frank Ricotti – additional percussion (1988 recording)

Charts

References

External links
 "Question" from Songfacts

1970 singles
1970 songs
Anti-war songs
The Moody Blues songs
Songs written by Justin Hayward